Lieutenant-Colonel Charles Morice (177518 June 1815) was a British Army officer killed at the Battle of Waterloo.

Life
Educated at Eton, he joined the 15th (The Yorkshire East Riding) Regiment of Foot as an ensign on 1June 1793. He was promoted to lieutenant on 6December 1794; to captain-lieutenant 27August 1799; to captain on 10November 1800 and to major on 17July 1802. He transferred first to Colonel Ramsay's Regiment 21May 1803 then to Colonel Baille's Regiment on 9August 1806 and then to the 3rd Ceylon Regiment on 31July 1806. He was promoted to lieutenant-colonel on 7January 1808 and was given command of the 2nd battalion of 69th Regiment of Foot on 4June 1813. His final promotion was to brevet colonel on 4June 1814.

Morice was wounded in the night attack on Bergen-op-Zoom on the 8/9 March 1814.

Death
As a result of either the inexperience or incompetence of William, Prince of Orange, commander of I Corps. 
Morice had been ordered to form his battalion of the 69th into square by Maj-General Sir Colin Halkett, commander of the 5th Brigade, when the Prince of Orange rode up and asked him why. He replied that they had been ordered to do so "not more than a few minutes ago". The Prince replied, "Colonel, there is really no chance of cavalry coming on. Reform column immediately then get back into line." Moments later the French cavalry charged, whereupon Morice and a number of others were killed and the king's colour lost.

He was killed at the battle of Waterloo.

His death is commemorated in a memorial tablet in St Mary the Virgin Church in Langley near Slough, Berkshire.

References

Bibliography

1775 births
1815 deaths
People educated at Eton College
British Army personnel of the Napoleonic Wars
69th Regiment of Foot officers
British military personnel killed in action in the Napoleonic Wars